Account Rendered is a 1957 British crime film directed by Peter Graham Scott and starring Griffith Jones, Ursula Howells and Honor Blackman. The film's sets were designed by Norman G. Arnold. It was made as a second feature for release by the Rank Organisation.

Premise
When wealthy Lucille Ainsworth is found strangled on Hampstead Heath, Detective Inspector Marshall is put on the case. Lucille's husband Robert suspected her of being unfaithful, and had been following her. But he is just one of many suspects with a motive for murder.

Cast
 Griffith Jones as Robert Ainsworth  
 Ursula Howells as Lucille Ainsworth  
 Honor Blackman as Sarah Hayward 
 Ewen Solon as Detective Inspector Marshall  
 Carl Bernard as Gilbert Morgan  
 Mary Jones as Nella Langford  
 Philip Gilbert as John Langford  
 John Van Eyssen as Clive Franklyn  
 Robert Raikes as Detective Sergeant Berry  
 Gordon Phillott as Rigby 
 Doris Yorke as Landlady  
 Vernon Smythe as Colonel Jarvis  
 Gerda Larsen as Blondi  
 Harry Ross as Bernard Goodman  
 Barry Steele as Barman  
 Edwin Richfield as Porter

Critical reception
The Radio Times called it "substandard"; whereas Britmovie called it an "efficient b-movie murder mystery based on Pamela Barrington’s 1953 pulp novel and directed by the tireless Peter Graham Scott. The plot is fairly straightforward but entertainingly interwoven by screenwriter Barbara S Harper and cinematographer Walter J. Harvey brings an air of tension to proceedings. The cast is entirely competent but a young pre-Bond Honor Blackman shines through."

References

Bibliography
 Chibnall, Steve & McFarlane, Brian. The British 'B' Film. Palgrave MacMillan, 2009.

External links
 

1957 films
1957 crime films
1950s English-language films
British crime films
Films based on British novels
Films directed by Peter Graham Scott
Films set in London
1950s British films